César Eduardo Pellegrín García (born 5 March 1979) is a Uruguayan former professional footballer who player as a left-back.

International career
Pellegrín played in 1997 and 1999 FIFA U-20 World Cup. 1999 he won the silver medal.

External links
 
 
 César Pellegrín at tenfieldigital.com.uy

1979 births
Living people
Footballers from Montevideo
Uruguayan footballers
Association football fullbacks
Danubio F.C. players
Juventus F.C. players
Ternana Calcio players
Club Nacional de Football players
Central Español players
Deportivo Maldonado players
Rovaniemen Palloseura players
El Tanque Sisley players
C.S. Herediano footballers
Rah Ahan players
Rampla Juniors players
Uruguayan Primera División players
Serie A players
Veikkausliiga players
Liga FPD players
Persian Gulf Pro League players
Uruguayan expatriate footballers
Uruguayan expatriate sportspeople in Italy
Uruguayan expatriate sportspeople in Finland
Uruguayan expatriate sportspeople in Costa Rica
Uruguayan expatriate sportspeople in Iran
Expatriate footballers in Italy
Expatriate footballers in Finland
Expatriate footballers in Costa Rica
Expatriate footballers in Iran
Uruguay youth international footballers
Uruguay under-20 international footballers
Uruguay international footballers